Casimiro Gennari (29 December 1839 – 31 January 1914) was an Italian cardinal of the Roman Catholic Church and was former Prefect of the Congregation of the Council.

Early life and priesthood
Casimiro Gennari  was born in Maratea, Basilicata. He did his initial studies with the Jesuits in Naples and at the seminary of Salerno. 

He was ordained to the priesthood on 21 March 1863 in Salerno. He then did pastoral care in the diocese of Conversano. He was the founder of the monthly Il Monitore Ecclesiastico, to help the clergy be in tune with the teaching of the Church, and was the first of its kind.

Episcopate
He was appointed as Bishop of Conversano on 13 May 1881. He was  consecrated, two days later by Cardinal Edward Howard. He was named assessor of the Congregation of the Holy Office on 15 November 1895. He was promoted to the titular see of Lepanto on 6 February 1897 but retained the administration of the see of Conversano.

Cardinalate
He was created Cardinal-Priest of San Marcello on 15 April 1901 by Pope Leo XIII. He participated in conclave of 1903 that elected Pope Pius X. He was appointed as Prefect of the Congregation of the Council on 20 October 1908 by Pope Pius, holding the post until his death in 1914.

References

1839 births
1914 deaths
People from Maratea
20th-century Italian cardinals
Bishops in Apulia
Members of the Sacred Congregation of the Council
19th-century Italian Roman Catholic bishops
20th-century Italian Roman Catholic bishops
Cardinals created by Pope Leo XIII